Euriphene taigola is a butterfly in the family Nymphalidae. It is found in Ivory Coast, Liberia and Sierra Leone. The habitat consists of wet forests.

References

Butterflies described in 2009
Euriphene